Whittemore Gulch is a valley in San Mateo County, California. It contains a small stream which is a tributary of Purisima Creek.

References

See also
List of watercourses in the San Francisco Bay Area

Valleys of San Mateo County, California
Landforms of the San Francisco Bay Area
Valleys of California